James Irvin Daniel Spencer (December 4, 1937 — October 22, 1999) was a Canadian ice hockey player who played 73 games in the World Hockey Association and 230 games in the National Hockey League between 1959 and 1974. Spencer played for the Philadelphia Blazers, Vancouver Blazers, New York Rangers, Detroit Red Wings and Boston Bruins.

Career statistics

Regular season and playoffs

References

External links
 

1937 births
1999 deaths
Boston Bruins players
Canadian ice hockey defencemen
Cincinnati Wings players
Detroit Red Wings players
Fort Worth Wings players
Hull-Ottawa Canadiens players
Ice hockey people from Ontario
Kitchener Canucks players
Memphis Wings players
New York Rangers players
Peterborough Petes (ice hockey) players
Philadelphia Blazers players
Pittsburgh Hornets players
Rhode Island Eagles players
San Diego Gulls (WHL) players
Sportspeople from Greater Sudbury
Springfield Indians players
Trois-Rivières Lions (EPHL) players
Vancouver Blazers players